Coleophora kuznetzovi is a moth of the family Coleophoridae. It is found in Tajikistan.

The larvae feed on Amygdalus, Crataegus, Malus, Pyrus and Cotoneaster species. They feed on the leaves of their host plant.

References

kuznetzovi
Insects of Central Asia
Moths described in 1961
Moths of Asia